The Bob's Burgers Movie is a 2022 American animated musical comedy film based on the Fox animated television series Bob's Burgers. It is directed by the series creator Loren Bouchard and series director Bernard Derriman (in their feature directorial debuts), written by Bouchard and Nora Smith, and produced by Janelle Momary-Neely, Bouchard, and Smith. The original voice cast from the series reprises their roles including H. Jon Benjamin, Dan Mintz, Eugene Mirman, Larry Murphy, John Roberts, Kristen Schaal, David Wain, Zach Galifianakis, and Kevin Kline. As the events of the film take place between the 12th and 13th seasons of Bob's Burgers, the plot follows Bob and his family as they struggle to pay their loan after a sinkhole opens in front of their restaurant and affects business, while the kids try to solve the murder of a carnie.

The film premiered at the El Capitan Theatre in Hollywood on May 17, 2022, and was theatrically released by 20th Century Studios in the United States on May 27, 2022, following previous delays of almost two years due to the COVID-19 pandemic. It received positive reviews from critics and has grossed $34 million worldwide. The film was dedicated to character designer Dave Creek and matte painter Denise Fuller, both of whom died prior to its release.

Plot

Six years ago, two figures get into a fight at the Wonder Wharf, where a gunshot rings out and one of the figures falls.  

In the present day, the Belcher family prepares for the day and discuss their plans for the summer ("Sunny Side Up Summer"); Bob and Linda plan to extend their loan from First Oceanside Savings Bank, Tina plans to confess to her crush Jimmy Jr., Gene constructs an instrument to perform at the half-renovated bandshell, and Louise wants to prove she's brave. 

Bob and Linda are denied an extension on their loan, and unless they pay it all in a week, their restaurant equipment will get repossessed. They decide to ask their landlord, Mr. Calvin Fischoeder, if they can skip rent for the month until they pay the loan. However, after a sinkhole forms in front of the restaurant, a skeleton of a carnie--Cotton Candy Dan--is discovered in it by the kids, and Mr. Fischoeder is charged for the murder. If he's convicted, they won't be able to get the rent skipped.

The Belcher children skip school so they can find out who truly committed the murder, which would free their landlord. After some investigation, including investigating a group of carnies ("Lucky Ducks"), questioning the police officer Sergeant Bosco and searching the Fischoder's treehouse, they conclude that Mr. Fischoeder's brother Felix is the killer. They ultimately end up in a secret clubhouse underground a ride called the Mole Hill at the Wonder Wharf. Calvin, Felix, and their cousin and family lawyer Grover are all hiding out in the clubhouse until the two brothers can flee the country because of the murder charge. Louise sees a photo that shows Grover wearing a cufflink that was found on the skeleton, and sees a faded bite mark on Grover's wrist, revealing that he was in fact the murderer. Grover soon notices what Louise is doing, and holds her, the other kids, and the Fischoeders hostage. 

Meanwhile at the restaurant, Bob, Linda and their family-friend Teddy prepare to sell burgers at Wonder Wharf using a portable food stand that Teddy builds in an attempt to come up with the money for the loan and rent. They make a good amount of money, but after being chased by carnies, run into the Mole Hill and fall into the secret clubhouse.

Grover, now pointing a speargun at his seven hostages, reveals his plan: to frame Calvin, kill him and Felix, burn the Mole Hill using a fuse and get the family trust money ("Not that Evil"). He decides that the plan can continue as normal, but the Belcher family must be killed as well. Calvin and Felix are first placed into the submarine designed to drown them, giving the Belchers time to escape. Grover chases the Belchers on go-karts, and in the end buries them in the sinkhole in front of their restaurant. The family is launched out by breaking a water main and they head back to the Mole Hill, where Louise stops the fuse from burning down the Mole Hill. The police send Grover to jail and save the Fischoeder brothers from drowning. Later, as the week ends, Bob and Linda finally pay the loan, Louise does the dead man's drop, Tina confesses to Jimmy Jr., and Gene's band performs at the bandshell ("The Itty Bitty Ditty Commitee/My Burger Buns").

Voice cast

Additional voices by H. Jon Benjamin, Loren Bouchard, Katie Crown, David Herman, Phil LaMarr, Larry Murphy, Hannah Parikh, Ben Pronsky, John Roberts, Michelle Ruff, and David Zyler

The characters of Jimmy Pesto Sr., Speedo Guy, Courtney, Mike the Mailman, Trev, Peter Pescadaro, Dodomeki, Bakaneko, Okoro Kamui, Burobu and Little King Trashmouth appear but have no lines. The characters of Gretchen, Mr. Business, Aunt Gayle, Harold and Edith Cranwinkle, Marshmallow, Mr. Branca and Arnold appear only in the sequence during the closing credits, in which various characters are seen dancing to the song "My Burger Buns". Gene's imaginary friend Ken is mentioned.

Production

Development

On October 4, 2017, 20th Century Fox announced that a film adaptation based on the Fox animated series Bob's Burgers was in development, and it was scheduled to be released on July 17, 2020. On October 30, 2017, a newly created 20th Century Fox division, Fox Family, was created to oversee feature film adaptation of its TV shows. This included taking Bob's Burgers over from 20th Century Fox Animation.

Series creator Loren Bouchard had said the film would "scratch every itch the fans of the show have ever had", while also appealing to new audiences. On July 18, 2018, Bouchard said that the script was submitted and accepted by the studios. The film is a musical comedy. On September 24, 2020, star H. Jon Benjamin confirmed that work on the film was being done remotely due to the COVID-19 pandemic, while also revealing that recording for the film has already begun, with the cast reprising their roles from the television series.

Bouchard said the budget for the film was $38 million and estimated that an additional $20 million was spent on marketing.

Animation
Animation services were provided by Tonic DNA, Lighthouse Studios, Bento Box Entertainment, Golden Wolf, Yeson Ententainment, Brilliant Pictures, Synergy Animation, Mighty Animation, Dave Enterprises, and Mercury Filmworks.  The production team wanted the film to be mostly done through hand-drawn animation because they wanted the visuals to remain similar to the series. The larger budget, time, and animators available to the filmmakers allowed the animation to be more detailed than in the original series, such as adding more light, texture, and shadows into several shots. This film would be the final animation work for both Tuck Tucker and Dale Baer before their deaths on December 22, 2020 and January 15, 2021 respectively. Tucker served as a storyboard revisionist, while Baer provided animation for the film.

Tonic DNA, who were hired due to already working with Bento Box Entertainment on the animated series Central Park, was originally set to work only in musical numbers, before being assigned two additional sequences. Animators at Tonic DNA used both hand-drawn and cutout animation techniques for the film, with both being simulteousnly used in certain sequences, particularly the "Lucky Ducks" musical number.

Music

Songs for the film were written by Loren Bouchard and Nora Smith while the original score was conducted, orchestrated and arranged by Tim Davies. The soundtrack album was released on May 27, 2022 and includes three of the four songs featured in the film. The third song was excluded to avoid revealing details of the film's plot.

Release

Theatrical
The Bob's Burgers Movie premiered at the El Capitan Theatre in Hollywood on May 17, 2022 and was theatrically released in the United States on May 27, 2022. It was initially scheduled to be released in theaters on July 17, 2020. The film was then briefly pulled from the schedule due to an error in listings. In announcing revised released dates of various films due to the global health crisis of the COVID-19 pandemic, Disney announced that the film's release had been pushed back to April 9, 2021. On January 22, 2021, the film was completely removed from the release schedule. Bouchard explained that despite the film still being in production, a new release date announcement was not imminent and would not come until audiences felt completely safe coming back to theaters. On September 10, 2021, it was officially set for a Memorial Day weekend release date of May 27, 2022.
In some countries however, such as Portugal, Spain, France, Mexico, Italy, and Israel, a theatrical release of the film did not end up happening at all despite there already being marked release dates for said countries, with the film instead premiering directly on Disney+ later on July 13, 2022 in those regions and on Star+ July 20, 2022, in Mexico.

Home media
The Bob's Burgers Movie was released on Blu-Ray, DVD, and Ultra HD Blu-ray on July 19, 2022 by 20th Century Studios Home Entertainment. Bonus features include an audio commentary track, deleted scenes, a behind-the-scenes featurette, and the animated short My Butt Has a Fever.

The Bob's Burgers Movie was also released digitally on July 12, through digital purchase on PVOD platforms and on Hulu and HBO Max in the United States on July 12, after Disney reached a deal with WarnerMedia in December 2021 for a majority of the upcoming films from 20th Century Studios to be streamed collaboratively between Disney+, HBO Max and Hulu until HBO's deal with 20th Century, signed in 2012 before Disney's acquisition of the company, runs out at the end of 2022. The film was released on Disney+ (under the Star hub) in Canada on July 12 and in Europe (excluding Poland, due to a distribution deal with Canal+ Poland for titles from 20th Century Studios), the Middle East, and Africa on July 13, while in Latin America, the film was released on Star+ on July 20.

Reception

SVOD viewership 
According to Whip Media, The Bob's Burgers Movie was the 2nd most watched film across all platforms in the United States, during the week of July 15, 2022. According to Nielsen, The Bob's Burgers Movie was the 5th most watched film across all platforms, during the week of July 17, 2022.

Box office
The Bob's Burgers Movie grossed $32 million in North America, and $2.2 million in other territories, for a worldwide total of $34.2 million.

In North America, the film was released alongside Top Gun: Maverick, and was projected to gross $10–15 million from 3,400 theaters in its opening weekend. The film made $5.7 million on its first day, including $1.5 million from Thursday night previews. It went on to debut at $12.4 million (and $14.8 million over the four-day Memorial Day frame), finishing third at the box office. The film stayed in the box office top ten until its sixth weekend.

Outside the U.S. and Canada, the film earned $700,000 from 54 international markets in its opening weekend. It made $400,000 from eight markets in its second weekend.

Bouchard acknowledged that the film's budget had not been formally disclosed and stated on Twitter that its production was $38 million. The film's box office earnings performed well in its own terms: Forbes highlighted that it earned $15 million in its first four days, despite expecting to earn $10 million at most. Deadline noted that around 1.1 million people watched it over its first weekend, comparable to the 1.3 million weekly regular viewers of the television series, and described the film as niche.

Critical reception
  Audiences polled by CinemaScore gave the film an average grade of "A" on an A+ to F scale, while PostTrak reported 89% of audience members gave it a positive score, with 69% saying they would definitely recommend it.

Accolades

Possible sequel
Before the film's release, screenwriters Loren Bouchard and Nora Smith expressed interest in making a sequel film. The principal cast, including Benjamin, Schaal, Roberts, Mirman, and Mintz, have also expressed interest in a sequel on the film's commentary.

References

External links
 
 

2020s American animated films
2020s musical comedy films
2022 films
2022 animated films
2022 comedy films
2022 directorial debut films
American adult animated films
20th Century Studios animated films
20th Century Animation films
20th Century Studios films
American animated films
American musical comedy films
Animated films based on animated series
Animated musical films
Bob's Burgers
Films about families
Films based on television series
Films postponed due to the COVID-19 pandemic
Films set in New Jersey
Films set in restaurants
Fox Television Animation films
Workplace comedy films